Salmincola is a genus of copepods belonging to the family Lernaeopodidae.

The species of this genus are found in Europe and Northern America.

Species

Species:

Salmincola californiensis 
Salmincola carpionis 
Salmincola coregonorum

References

Copepods